Save Ferris is an American ska punk band formed circa 1995 in Orange County, California, United States. Their name is a reference to the 1986 film Ferris Bueller's Day Off. In 1995, the band began to perform underground venues in Southern California. In 1996, the band won a Grammy showcase award for best unsigned band and a contract with Epic Records. Their album It Means Everything from 1997 was their first full-length album. By 1999, the band moved from ska-pop into pop-punk. After a hiatus, in 2017, Save Ferris released the Checkered Past EP.

The band is best remembered for their 1997 cover of "Come On Eileen", originally by the British new wave band Dexys Midnight Runners.

History

1995–1996: Early years and Introducing Save Ferris EP
The band came together after the dissolution of a number of Orange County, California bands.  With the band working together under their own “Starpool” label, they began to book shows around Southern California to a great underground response.

The band released their debut EP Introducing Save Ferris on their own label, Starpool Records in 1996, and ended up selling close to 20,000 copies of their EP “out of the trunks of their cars.” That year, Monique Powell provided vocals on the Reel Big Fish song "She Has A Girlfriend Now" from their album Turn the Radio Off (Mojo), which is considered one of RBF’s most requested songs to date.

Riding a wave of support from fans all over Southern California, Save Ferris became favorites of KROQ radio’s legendary “Rodney on the Rock”, which resulted in regular airplay on LA’s world-famous KROQ radio station, possibly being the first unsigned band to do this in LA alternative radio history.  Later that year, the National Academy of Recording Arts and Sciences gave the band a Grammy showcase award for best-unsigned band, earning them a recording contract with Epic Records (SONY).

1997: It Means Everything and mainstream success
The band released their debut full-length album, It Means Everything, for Epic in 1997.  The album featured several re-recorded tracks from the EP, some new songs, and a cover of Dexys Midnight Runners' "Come On Eileen", which became the band’s most successful single to date. It Means Everything also featured the single "The World is New," which was featured in the film The Big Hit starring Mark Wahlberg, and was later featured in the trailers for Senseless and Thomas and the Magic Railroad, as well as an episode of the TV series 7th Heaven.

Save Ferris toured extensively in support of It Means Everything, opening for bands such as Sugar Ray, The Offspring, Goldfinger, and Reel Big Fish and two mainstage spots on the Vans Warped Tour in 1998 and 2000. In April 1998, they made their television debut on HBO's music series Reverb and made an on-screen appearance in the teen film 10 Things I Hate About You. The album sold over 400,000 copies, and spawned three Top Ten hits in both Japan and Mexico.  With two singles in the Billboard top 100 and full rotation on alternative radio all over the world, It Means Everything was able to go Platinum internationally.

1998–1999: Modified era
After the departure of the band’s first drummer, Marc Harismendy, in 1998, Save Ferris regrouped and released their appropriately titled sophomore album for Epic records, Modified, in October 1999. The album saw the band moving away from their ska-pop roots and into pop-punk territory. The album also spawned three Top Ten hits in both Japan and Mexico. The song "The Only Way to Be" was used in 2000 film Scary Movie.

Save Ferris supported Modified on tour throughout the next several years including a trek with Lit in the U.S. and a headlining tour of the UK.

2000–2003: Hiatus, and For the Fans tour
The band performed at the 2002 Winter Olympics between the qualifiers and the finals of the Men's Halfpipe at the competition venue in Park City.  

Through the years, Save Ferris went through a number of changes in their lineup, most notably the departure of Brian Mashburn, the band’s main songwriter, who quit Save Ferris in 2002.  Soon to follow Mashburn were Eric Zamora and Bill Uechi, departing to start a new band. Save Ferris announced their break up in October 2002.

Soon after the departure of Mashburn, Powell self-financed what she called the "For the Fans" Save Ferris US tour in 2003, which included a mainstage performance at Ska Summit in Las Vegas for over 10,000 fans.

2004–2012: Post-breakup
From 2004 to 2008, Powell appeared on albums by The Used, Lostprophets, Hilary Duff, Goldfinger and others. She also started a now defunct band called The Mojo Wire in 2008, and toured in the LA area.

In 2003, Bill Uechi, Brian Mashburn, T-Bone Willy, Eric Zamora, and Oliver Zavala started the band Starpool with Alan Meade original member of No Doubt on vocals and Phil Hanson on drums.

2013–present: Revival
Save Ferris, now led by Powell, went on indefinite hiatus from 2003 until the spring of 2013, in which Powell once again regrouped and headlined the Pacific Amphitheatre in Orange County, CA to a sold out audience of over 7,000 fans, and another sold out show at the El Rey theater in Los Angeles.

The Pacific Amphitheatre performance resulted in a lawsuit being filed by the former members over of the band's name. The lawsuit stated that Powell never contacted or invited her former bandmates to perform at the show, although she stated this wasn't the case. Powell responded with her own countersuit in 2015. Ultimately, Powell won the rights to the band’s name, brand and social-media pages. Powell was also awarded writing credits on several songs she had previously not been credited on. In October 2015, a message indicating that the lawsuits between the members has been amicably resolved was posted to the band's official website although the message has since been removed.

Also in 2015, ASCAP songwriting records were updated to represent Powell as co-writer on a number of Save Ferris songs not previously represented in the liner notes of the albums.

In 2016, Save Ferris ran a successful Pledge Music campaign to raise money for what would be the first new album in over 15 years. Their financial goal was hit in only a couple of weeks, fully funded by their fans. They co-headlined Mexico City Ska Fest 2016 with the Mighty Mighty Bosstones.

On February 10, 2017, Save Ferris released the Checkered Past EP, their first release in 18 years. The EP was produced by Oingo Boingo bassist John Avila and features a guest appearance by Neville Staple of The Specials on the EP's first single, "New Sound". The band toured the album in 2017, and took part in the US Warped Tour during the summer of 2017.

Lineup
 Current
 Monique Powell – lead vocals (1995–2003, 2013–present), keyboards (1995–2003)
 Justin Linn - guitars, vocals (2018-present)
 Alex Csillag – trombone and keyboards (2017–present)
 Tristan Hurd - trumpet (2023-present)
 Jamie Howell - drums (2023-present)
 Jake Courlang - bass (2023-present)

 Past
 Bill Uechi – bass (1995–2002)
 Eric Zamora – alto and tenor saxophone (1995–2002)
 Brian Mashburn – guitar and backing vocals (1995–2002)
 Jesse Tunnell – trombone (1995–1996)
 T-Bone Willy – trombone (1996–2002)
 José Castellaños – trumpet (1995–2000)
 Oliver Zavala – trumpet & backing vocals (2000–02)
 Adam Plost - Guitar (2000)
 Steve White – trumpet (2002)
 Steve Cordero – drums (1995)
 Marc Harismendy – drums (1995–98)
 Evan Kilbourne – drums (1998–2002)
 Denny Weston Jr. — drums (2013–2015)
 Joe Berry — saxophone, additional guitar and backing vocals (2013–2015)
 Gordon Bash — bass and backing vocals (2013–2017), trumpet (2013–2015)
 Patrick Ferguson — guitar (2013–2017)
 Erik Hughes — trombone (2013–2016)
 Alex Burke — keyboards (2013–2016)
 Scott Jones — trumpet (2015)
 Connor McElwain — trumpet (2015–2017)
 Richard Velzen – trombone (2016–2017)
 Jonathan Levi Shanes – keyboards (2016–2017)
 Alexander Mathias — saxophone (2016–2017)
 Jesse Stern – bass and backing vocals (2017–2018)
 Nate Light – bass and backing vocals (2018–present)
 Max O'Leary – trumpet (2017–present)
 Brandon Dickert — drums (2015–present)
 Adrienne Nolff - co-lead vocals (1995–1996)

Timeline

Discography

Albums

EPs

Singles

Other appearances
The following Save Ferris songs were released on compilation albums and soundtracks. This is not an exhaustive list; songs that were first released on the band's albums and EPs are not included.

References

American ska punk musical groups
Musical groups from Orange County, California
Third-wave ska groups
Musical groups established in 1995
Musical groups disestablished in 2003
Musical groups reestablished in 2013
Columbia Records artists
Epic Records artists
Orange County School of the Arts alumni